Erdenet (literally "with treasure") is the third-largest city in Mongolia, with a 2018 population of 98,045, and the capital of the aimag (province) of Orkhon.

History
Erdenet, one of the youngest settlements in Mongolia, was founded in 1974 in an area where large deposits of copper had been discovered in the 1950s. A single-track railway line with a length of  linking Erdenet to the Trans-Mongolian Railway was inaugurated in 1977. In the middle of the 1980s, more than 50% of the inhabitants were Russians working as engineers or miners. After the fall of Soviet Communism in 1990, however, most Russians left Erdenet. Today, about 10% of the population is Russian.

Erdenet Mining Corporation 

The city hosts the fourth largest copper mine in the world. The Erdenet Mining Corporation is a joint Mongolian-Russian venture, and accounts for a majority of Mongolia's hard currency income. Erdenet mines 22.23 million tons of ore per year, producing 126,700 tons of copper and 1,954 tons of molybdenum. The mine accounts for 13.5% of Mongolia's GDP and 7% of tax revenue. About 8,000 people are employed in the mine.

Infrastructure
Erdenet is linked to Ulaanbaatar, the capital of Mongolia, and to the towns of Darkhan and Bulgan by a paved road and is easily accessible by bus several times each day. Train connections between Erdenet and Ulaanbaatar are less comfortable as there is only one train per day covering the distance in 11 hours.

Sights
Tourists are allowed to visit the mine by appointment.
Every year, about 2,000 tons of wool are processed in the factory where about 1,100 people are employed.
The Mining Museum, in the Culture Palace on the central town square.
The Aimag Museum was founded in 1983.
The Fraternity Monument dating from 1984 is on a hill offering a scenic view of the whole city in the northeastern part of Erdenet.
A new temple with a large Buddha statue was built very recently in the eastern part of Erdenet.
An amusement park was laid out in the east of the center.
It was founded between 1727 and 1737, partially destroyed by order of Khorloogiin Choibalsan in 1937 and reconstructed after 1975 using financial aid provided by the UNESCO.

Population

Climate
Erdenet has a subarctic climate (Köppen climate classification: Dwc). Summers are typically warm and rainy with cool nights, while winters are long, very cold, and dry.

Gallery

Notable residents 

 Tsakhiagiin Elbegdorj, former President of Mongolia

Twin towns – sister cities
Erdenet is twinned with:

References

External links 

 Erdenet Mining Corporation

 
Districts of Orkhon Province
Populated places established in 1975
Aimag centers
Mining communities in Mongolia
Socialist planned cities